A hybrid camel is a hybrid between a Bactrian camel (Camelus bactrianus) and dromedary (Camelus dromedarius).

Names 
Hybrid camels have different names depending on zone and language. Some names include turkoman, tülu, bukht, nar, iner, iver, majen, bertuar, yaml, dromano, and dromel.

Tülu 

A tülu camel is a breed of camel that results from mating a male Bactrian camel with a female dromedary.  This breed is sometimes called an F1 hybrid camel.  The resulting camel is larger than either a Bactrian or a dromedary, and has traditionally been used as a draft animal.  This breed of camel is also the breed used in the sport of camel wrestling. Tülu camels have one large hump.

Khorasan 
Khorasan camels are a double-humped sturdy crossbreed between Arabian and Central Asian species. They were common in the caravans of ancient Persia.

Characteristics
Generally a Camelus bactrianus × Camelus dromedarius hybrid is called an F1. This type of camel is extremely strong and is useful for hard work such as plowing and carrying loads. It was also used in war by the Ottoman Turks. It is generally docile and tame. It is fertile.

Pure camel hybrids are mostly found in Russia, Iran, Afghanistan, and Turkey; but they can be found in Saudi Arabia, Turkmenistan and Kazakhstan as well.

The F1 can be further hybridized. An F1 female can mate with a male Bactrian camel: the result is a B1 backcross Bactrian. It generally has two humps and is faster than a common Bactrian and stronger than a dromedary. It can walk over snow, ice, and mud and is suitable even for mountain trails; this type can be found mostly in Kazakhstan.

When an F1 female mates with a dromedary, the result is an B1 backcross dromedary, a slightly stronger dromedary and a rare type nowadays.

Other camelid hybridizations
Cama, a hybrid with camel and llama.
Huarizo, a cross between male llama and female alpaca
Llamanaco, a cross between guanaco and llama has been reported in the wild in the Magallanes Region of Chile.

References

External links
Bactrian Camels and Bactrian-Dromedary Hybrids
Intact Ottoman 'war camel' found in Austrian cellar
Dromedary (Camelus dromedarius) and Bactrian camel (Camelus bactrianus) crossbreeding husbandry practices in Turkey and Kazakhstan: An in-depth review

Camelid hybrids
Domesticated animals
Camels